First Methodist Church, also known as Mt. Zion Methodist Church, First Methodist Episcopal Church, and Marietta Baptist Church, is a historic Methodist church located at 114 N. Marietta Street in Excelsior Springs, Clay County, Missouri. It was built in 1948, and incorporated portions of the existing 1903 Gothic Revival style church.  The interior is based on the Akron Plan.  The church features square tower pavilions topped by large octagonal cupolas supported by buttresses.

It was listed on the National Register of Historic Places in 2009.

References

Methodist churches in Missouri
Baptist churches in Missouri
Churches completed in 1948
Churches on the National Register of Historic Places in Missouri
Buildings and structures in Clay County, Missouri
National Register of Historic Places in Clay County, Missouri
Gothic Revival church buildings in Missouri